Deadline: Sirf 24 Ghante is a 2006 Indian Hindi suspense thriller film featuring Konkona Sen Sharma, Irfan Khan and Rajit Kapur in the lead roles. The film is a Bollywood adaptation of the Charlize Theron-Kevin Bacon film Trapped, which was based on the Greg Iles novel 24 Hours.

Plot 

Heart surgeon Dr. Viren Goenka (Rajit Kapur), his wife Sanjana (Konkona Sen Sharma) and their seven-year-old daughter Anishka (Jhanak Shukla) live in Mumbai. Their joys have just multiplied with Viren being honoured with a prestigious award for his contribution to the medical world.

Viren is all set to visit New Delhi to receive this award. He promises to celebrate his daughter's birthday once he returns. But fate has something else planned for Viren and his family: Anishka is kidnapped under Sanjana's nose. She is startled with the presence of a creepy man named Krish (Irfan Khan) in her house. Krish tells her that Anishka will be fine as long as Sanjana and Dr. Goenka follow his instructions.

While Krish keeps Sanjana in the house, his partner Roohi (Sandhya Mridul) keeps Viren confined in his hotel room and their third associate Kabir (Zakir Hussain) holds Anishka at a remote location. The kidnappers keep strict half-hour checks with each other by cell phones and set the ransom amount at Rs. 3 crores.

It doesn't take much for Viren and Sanjana to realise that abiding by the kidnappers' terms is the best thing that they could do to save their daughter's life. Viren mortgages everything possible, including his dream hospital project and his house, and manages to collect Rs. 3 crores in within the 24-hour deadline given to him by the kidnappers.

But the kidnappers flee without any signs of their daughter and take away the ransom money as well. Sanjana and Viren are uncertain about what could have happened and fear for the life of their beloved daughter. Viren wants his daughter back at any cost and thus, tries to exploit all his sources. The police searches for clues, but there's no breakthrough.

Finally Sanjana and Viren realise that the kidnappers' motive was not ransom but revenge. And the end, the kidnappers return their daughter and all the money. The reason they kidnapped Viren's Daughter teaches him the lesson that the medical profession is a noble one and that he had been extremely money-minded in treating some of his patients.

Cast 
Konkona Sen Sharma ... Sanjana Goenka
Irfan Khan ... Krish Vaidya
Rajit Kapur ... Dr. Viren Goenka
Sandhya Mridul ... Roohi Vaidya
Jhanak Shukla ... Anishka Goenka
Zakir Hussain ... Kabir
Rajeev Verma ... Police Commissioner Rana
Preiti ... Dia
Purnima Suryawanshi ...Zee News TV anchor
Nasiruddin Khan ... Sinha
Manohar Pandit ...Mehra

References

External links

2006 films
2000s Hindi-language films
Hindi films remade in other languages
Indian remakes of American films